Tulipa gesneriana, the Didier's tulip or garden tulip, is a species of plant in the lily family, cultivated as an ornamental in many countries because of its large, showy flowers. This tall, late-blooming species has a single blooming flower and linear or broadly lanceolate leaves. This is a complex hybridized neo-species, and can also be called Tulipa × gesneriana. Most of the cultivars of tulip are derived from Tulipa gesneriana. It has become naturalised in parts of central and southern Europe and scattered locations in North America.

This hybrid is widely believed to have originated in Tian Shan of China, from the collections of the sultan of the Ottoman Empire in Istanbul, as is the case with other species of tulips that came into Europe. In 1574, Sultan Selim II ordered the Kadi of A‘azāz in Syria to send him 50,000 tulip bulbs. However, Harvey points out several problems with this source, and there is also the possibility that tulips and hyacinth (sümbüll), originally Indian spikenard (Nardostachys jatamansi) have been confused. Sultan Selim also imported 300,000 bulbs of Kefe Lale (also known as Cafe-Lale, from the medieval name Kaffa, probably Tulipa schrenkii) from the port of Kefe in Crimea, for his gardens in the  Topkapı Sarayı in Istanbul. They are hybridized with other species present in the collections. Tulipa schrenkii is genetically very closely related to Tulipa gesneriana, and sometimes classified in the same species.

Tulipa gesneriana was introduced to western Europe from Constantinople in 1554. It was first described in 1559 by Conrad Gesner.

When the tulip originally arrived in Europe from the Ottoman Empire, its popularity soared and it quickly became a status symbol for the newly wealthy merchants of the Dutch Golden Age. As a mosaic virus began to infect bulbs, producing rare and spectacular effects in the bloom but weakening and destroying the already limited number of bulbs, a speculative frenzy now known as tulip mania was triggered between 1634 and 1637. Bulbs were exchanged for land, livestock, and houses, and the Dutch created futures markets where contracts to buy bulbs at the end of the season were bought and sold. A single bulb, the Semper Augustus, fetched 6,000 florins in Haarlem — at that time, a florin could purchase a bushel of wheat.

The flower and bulb can cause dermatitis through the allergen, tuliposide A, even though the bulbs may be consumed with little ill effect. The bulbs may be dried and pulverised and added to cereals or flour.

The sweet-scented bisexual flowers appear during April and May. Bulbs are extremely resistant to frost and can tolerate temperatures well below freezing — a period of low temperature is necessary to induce proper growth and flowering, triggered by an increase in sensitivity to the phytohormone auxin.

The UK National Collection of Tulipa spp. is held by T Freeth at the Royal Botanic Gardens, Kew.

Anthocyanins have been found in various tulip flowers, such as Tulipa gesneriana, Tulipa fosteriana and Tulipa eichleri.

References

External links

gesneriana
Flora of Turkey
Ephemeral plants
Plants described in 1753
Taxa named by Carl Linnaeus